The 2005 UC Davis football team represented the University of California, Davis as a member of the Great West Conference (GWC) during the 2005 NCAA Division I-AA football season. Led by 13th-year head coach Bob Biggs, UC Davis compiled an overall record of 6–5 with a mark of 4–1 in conference play, sharing the GWC title with Cal Poly. 2005 was the 36th consecutive winning season for the Aggies. The team outscored their opponents 217 to 184 for the season. The Aggies played home games at Toomey Field in Davis, California.

Schedule

References

UC Davis
UC Davis Aggies football seasons
Great West Conference football champion seasons
UC Davis Aggies football